Jeruto Kiptum Kiptubi (born 12 December 1981) is a Kenyan middle-distance runner who specializes in the 3000 metres steeplechase.

She was born in 1981 in Metkei, Keiyo District. She studied at the Singore Girls Secondary School in Iten, like many other Kenyan women runners.

International competitions

Personal bests
800 metres - 2:04.00 min (2000)
1500 metres - 4:08.6 min (2000)
3000 metres - 9:01.90 min (1999)
3000 metres steeplechase - 9:23.35 min (2006)

External links

1981 births
Living people
Kenyan female steeplechase runners
Kenyan female middle-distance runners
World Athletics Championships athletes for Kenya
World Athletics Championships medalists
People from Baringo County
Kenyan male cross country runners
Athletes (track and field) at the 2006 Commonwealth Games
Commonwealth Games competitors for Kenya